Gabby Cantorna (born 2 August 1995) is an American rugby union player. She plays for the United States and for Exeter Chiefs in the Premier 15s.

Biography 
Cantorna grew up in Pennsylvania and began playing rugby at the age of 14. She went to Pennsylvania State University and won four National College Championships. In 2017 she was awarded the D1 Elite National Championship MVP award.

Cantorna made her international debut for the United States against New Zealand in 2018 during the Eagles Autumn Internationals. In 2020, She signed a one year contract with the Exeter Chiefs.

Cantorna was named in the Eagles squad for the 2022 Pacific Four Series in New Zealand. She was selected in the Eagles squad for the 2021 Rugby World Cup in New Zealand.

References

External links 

 Eagles Profile
 Exeter Chiefs Profile

Living people
1995 births
Female rugby union players
American female rugby union players
United States women's international rugby union players